Maryland Route 195 (MD 195) is a state highway in the U.S. state of Maryland. Known as Carroll Avenue, the state highway runs  from Eastern Avenue at the District of Columbia boundary in Takoma Park north to MD 193 in Silver Spring. MD 195 is the main north–south state highway through Takoma Park in southeastern Montgomery County. The highway provides access to Washington Adventist University and Washington Adventist Hospital and crosses Sligo Creek on the Carroll Avenue Bridge. The state highway was constructed from Washington, D.C. to Silver Spring in the late 1920s on a road that has existed since the 19th century. The Carroll Avenue Bridge was built in 1932 as the third bridge at the site. Reconstruction of the bridge began in 2015 and was completed in 2017.

Route description

MD 195 begins at the intersection of Carroll Avenue, Eastern Avenue, and Willow Street at the District of Columbia boundary in the city of Takoma Park. The highway continues west as Carroll Street through the Takoma neighborhood of Washington, D.C., where it provides access to the Takoma station on the Washington Metro's Red Line. MD 195 heads east as a two-lane undivided street through the Takoma Park Historic District. The highway turns north at its intersection with Laurel Avenue, then veers northeast toward Takoma Junction. There, MD 195 briefly runs concurrently with MD 410. MD 410 heads northwest from Takoma Junction toward Silver Spring along Philadelphia Avenue and east from the concurrency along Ethan Allen Avenue. MD 195 continues northeast on Carroll Avenue and descends into the valley of Sligo Creek. Old Carroll Avenue splits northeast toward Sligo Creek Parkway as the state highway veers north and crosses the Carroll Avenue Bridge, a triple span reinforced concrete, open spandrel arch bridge that crosses the parkway, the creek, and the Sligo Creek Trail.

North of the Carroll Avenue Bridge, MD 195 passes the main entrance to Washington Adventist Hospital and intersects Flower Avenue, which was formerly MD 787 and is the main street through the Washington Adventist University campus. The state highway continues northeast from Flower Avenue and reaches the north city limit of Takoma Park beyond Garland Avenue. MD 195, which closely follows the city limit to its northern terminus, crosses Long Branch and veers north out of the stream valley. The highway gains an intermittent median and has a northbound service road, which is unsigned MD 195A, and passes the Davis-Warner House. MD 195 reaches its northern terminus at an oblique intersection with MD 193 (University Boulevard) on the eastern edge of Silver Spring. Carroll Avenue continues north as a county highway toward its northern end at MD 320 (Piney Branch Road).

History

Carroll Avenue was part of an old road between Washington, D.C. and Sandy Spring that roughly followed present-day MD 195, MD 320, and MD 650 north to Ashton. The street itself was named for Samuel S. Carroll, the owner of the land around present day Takoma Junction prior to its purchase by Benjamin Franklin Gilbert in 1883 to create his planned suburb of Takoma Park. MD 195 was paved over its whole length between 1928 and 1930. The highway's bridge across Long Branch was replaced in 2005, the same year the northbound service road north of Long Branch was built. The portion of MD 195 from Flower Avenue to near Garland Avenue was under municipal maintenance since at least 1930, although the Maryland State Highway Administration (MDSHA) may have unwittingly performed maintenance on it since then. The city and state officially transferred ownership of the Flower-to-Garland stretch in an agreement dated February 16, 2013.

Junction list

Auxiliary route
MD 195A is the designation for the Carroll Avenue Service Road, a  one-lane service road that parallels the northbound side of MD 195 between Glenside Drive and Chester Street north of Long Branch.

See also

References

External links

MDRoads: MD 195

195
Maryland Route 195